Streptomyces nigrescens is a bacterium species from the genus of Streptomyces which has been isolated from soil. Streptomyces nigrescens produces 5-alkyl-1,2,3,4-tetrahydroquinolines and the antibiotics phoslactomycin A - F.

See also 
 List of Streptomyces species

References

Further reading

External links
Type strain of Streptomyces nigrescens at BacDive -  the Bacterial Diversity Metadatabase

nigrescens
Bacteria described in 1958